Harriman is a village in Orange County, New York, United States. It is in the southeastern section of the town of Monroe, with a small portion in the town of Woodbury. The population was 2,714 at the 2020 census. It is part of the Poughkeepsie–Newburgh–Middletown, NY Metropolitan Statistical Area as well as the larger New York–Newark–Bridgeport, NY-NJ-CT-PA Combined Statistical Area.

Geography
Harriman is located at  (41.308442, -74.147317).

NY-17, NY-17M and NY-32 connect in the village. New York Route 17, US Route 6, and Interstate 87 (New York State Thruway) connect north of the village. Harriman State Park is located east of the village.

History
The village is named after E. H. Harriman, former president of the Union Pacific railroad, whose estate — Arden — is adjacent to the village. Previously, the village was known as Turner, from the early restaurant of Peter Turner.

Edward Henry Harriman attended school in New York and New Jersey, but dropped out when he was 14 years old and took on the job of Wall Street message boy. He swiftly became a managing clerk, and then at the age of 22 he became a stockbroker with a seat on the New York Stock Exchange. He married Mary Williamson Averell and by 1881 his career as a rebuilder of bankrupt tracks began on the Lake Ontario Southern Railway, which Harriman fixed up and sold to the Pennsylvania Railroad for an outstanding profit. He became one of the most powerful men in America from owning various railroads with aspirations of owning all of them. 

Harriman went on a voyage which became known as the Harriman Alaska Expedition. In 1899, Harriman along with a superior group of scientists, photographers, artists, and naturalists set out to explore the coast of Alaska. This was a two-month expedition traveling from Seattle to Siberia, and then back again. He visited and documented several different places along the Alaskan coast with various discoveries he brought back to Seattle at the end of the voyage on July 30. E.H. Harriman died September 9, at his home at age 62.

In 1950, Harriman had a population of 676.

Demographics

As of the census of 2010, there was total population of 2,424 people consisting of 1,177 males making up 48.6% and 1,247 females at 51.4%. There was a 7.6% increase in total population from a decade ago. The median resident age was 37.1 years old. The estimated median household income in 2009 was $68,731 with an estimated capita income of 37,795.

White resident population recorded:	1,621
Black or African American resident population recorded:	325
American Indian and Alaska native resident population recorded:	18
Asian resident population recorded:	251
Native Hawaiian and other Pacific Islander resident population recorded:	1
Hispanic or Latino of any race resident population recorded:	439
Resident population of some other race recorded:	125
Resident population of two or more races recorded:	83

51.54% of the residents are Democratic, 47.4% are Republican, and the remaining 1.062% are independent.

The estimated median house or condo value in 2009 was $244.914. The median gross rent in 2009 was $1,163.

For population 25 years and over in Harriman
High school or higher: 87.0%
Bachelor's degree or higher: 30.0%
Graduate or professional degree: 9.3%
Unemployed: 6.3%

Marital status
Never married: 27.5%
Now married: 52.6%
Separated: 4.3%
Widowed: 5.6%
Divorced: 9.9%

276 residents are foreign-born with 4.3% Asian, 4.2% Latin American, and 2.9% European.

Religion
53.1% of Harriman is religious with the majority being Catholic at 35.48%. The next most common religion Jewish, making a percentage of 6.45 of the community. Baptist, LDS, Episcopalian, Pentecostal, Lutheran, Methodist, Presbyterian, other Christian, Eastern, and Islam make up the remainder of the religious percentage.

Education
Harriman is part of the Monroe-Woodbury school district with most of the children in the town attend either Sapphire or Smith Clove which covers kindergarten through first grade. From there the children go to Central Valley, North Main, or Pine Tree elementary school for grades 2-5. Next Harriman kids then enter Monroe-Woodbury Middle School for grades 6-8. The Middle School consists of four houses named Green, Red, Yellow, and Blue and same with the High School with A, B, C, and D House. The Monroe-Woodbury High School is directly to the left of the middle school and here is where most adolescents go to school for grades 9-12.

Attractions

Harriman State Park
Harriman State Park, just east of the village, is the second biggest state park in New York. The park is located in Orange and Rockland counties 30 miles north of New York City. The park is known for its 31 lakes, vistas, and public camping areas. Harriman State Park borders Bear Mountain State Park and the United States Military Academy's forest reserve, as well as partially bordering Sterling Forest State Park to the southwest. 
E.H. and Mary Harriman owned 30,000 acres of land on part of their estate in Arden, New York. The state made a decision to build a prison at Bear Mountain. The Harrimans opposed this action and wanted to donate some of their land to the state in order to build a park. Once E.H. died, Mary made a proposal to the Governor that she would make a donation of 10,000 acres and $1 million for the establishment of a new state park. The state must stop the plan to build the prison with $2.5 million to gain more land and construct park facilities. 
By 1913, Major William A. Welch began constructing the road from Bear Mountain to Sloatsburg, which is known today as Seven Lakes Drive. Several roads were being created around Bear Mountain in order to make it easier for the public to get to the new park. There was even a steamboat service from Manhattan that would transport people back and forth with the cost of 85 cents for adults and 45 cents for children.

There are more than 40 known hiking trails located in Harriman, as well as over 30 lakes and ponds.

Woodbury Common Premium Outlets
The Woodbury Common Premium Outlets is a major tourist attraction in New York. This is a shopping center located in Central Valley, New York which is only 5 minutes from Harriman when traveling north on route 17. The outlet opened in 1985, expanded 8 years later, and again in 1998. The center has 220 stores covering over 800,000 square feet of land and is one of the largest outlet centers in the world. Because of the immense size, there are different sections that are arranged by colors to make it easier for the public to find the store they are looking for. On the weekend there is a trolley service that is available to transport shoppers around the center and from the parking lots. 
Woodbury Common is a major attraction for foreign tourists visiting the area. The most common tourists are Japanese because the outlet has cheaper prices than if the people were to get the same item in the country. Some stores claim that 40-50% of the profit they make comes from Japanese tourists. There are shuttle buses from New York City that make the trip to the commons. This outlet goes down in history as one of the most popular centers for tourism in the United States.

The Harriman Engine Company is a volunteer fire company that serves the village of Harriman and parts of the town of Monroe. It was established in 1928 when there was a need in the community for fire protection.

Transportation
The New York State Thruway (I-87) runs along the eastern perimeter of Harriman. New York State Route 17 also serves the village. The business route, New York State Route 17M runs through the main village core. US Route 6 runs along the northern perimeter of Harriman. 

Harriman station on the Metro-North Railroad's commuter rail Port Jervis Line is to the southeast, off Route 17. An older stop on Grove Street in the village downtown served the Erie Railroad main line until 1983.

References

External links

 

Villages in New York (state)
Villages in Orange County, New York
Poughkeepsie–Newburgh–Middletown metropolitan area